Dacia Arcaraz (born Dacia del Pilar Arcaraz González, 8 March 1967 in Mexico City, Mexico) is a Mexican actress.

Filmography

References

External links

1967 births
Living people
Mexican child actresses
Mexican telenovela actresses
Mexican television actresses
Mexican film actresses
Actresses from Mexico City
20th-century Mexican actresses
21st-century Mexican actresses